J. L. R. McCollum (January 4, 1842 – July 3, 1931) was a member of the Wisconsin State Assembly.

Biography
McCollum was born on January 4, 1842, in Leicester, Massachusetts. He graduated from a school that is now known as Bryant & Stratton College in 1864. On March 15 of that year, McCollum married Eliza Seaman Krouskop. They had three children. He died on July 3, 1931, in Richland, Richland County, Wisconsin, and was buried in Sextonville, Wisconsin.

Career
McCollum was a member of the Assembly in 1876 and 1877. He was a Democrat.

References

External links

RootsWeb
Geni.com

1842 births
1931 deaths
People from Leicester, Massachusetts
People from Richland County, Wisconsin
Democratic Party members of the Wisconsin State Assembly
Burials in Wisconsin
Bryant and Stratton College alumni